Glebe House of Southwark Parish, also known as The Old Glebe, is a historic glebe house located near Spring Grove, Surry County, Virginia.  It was built about 1724, and is a -story, three bay, single pile, central-hall plan brick dwelling.  It has a gambrel roof with dormers, added in the 19th century, has exterior end chimneys, and sits on a brick basement. Also on the property is a contributing frame smokehouse. The glebe house was sold, as required by the legislature during the 
Disestablishment of 1802. It was subsequently remodeled and used as a private dwelling.It sits on the site of Indian Spring Plantation patented by Nicholas Merriweather in 1666. The property is currently owned by the Perkins family.

It was listed on the National Register of Historic Places in 1976.

References

Properties of religious function on the National Register of Historic Places in Virginia
Houses completed in 1724
National Register of Historic Places in Surry County, Virginia
Houses in Surry County, Virginia
Houses on the National Register of Historic Places in Virginia
1724 establishments in the Thirteen Colonies